Pavle Matejić (1770–1816), known as Paulj, was a Serbian Revolutionary that participated in the First Serbian Uprising (1804–13). Starting out as a captain under the command of Petar Dobrnjac, Paulj was elevated to vojvoda (general) in the Gornja Mlava region upon showing his courage. He took part in the successful campaigns in the eastern parts of the Belgrade Pashaluk, and the campaign to take Niš (1809).

Life
He was born in the village of Melnica, at that time part of the Požarevac nahiya in the Sanjak of Smederevo ("Belgrade Pashaluk").

He became a buljubaša (captain) already by the beginning of the uprising, appointed by Petar Dobrnjac. For his courage and other great traits, he was later appointed vojvoda (general) in Gornja Mlava. Paulj Matejić participated in the victories in the eastern parts of the Belgrade Pashaluk that strengthened rebel holding.

A rebel army led by commanders Miloje Todorović, Petar Dobrnjac, Ilija Barjaktarović, Paulj Matejić, Stevan Sinđelić and Veljko Petrović arrived on  1809 outside Niš. During preparations for the takeover of Niš, Paulj made a trench above the village of Kamenica. The trench, above the church, had two cannons. It was one of eleven or twelve rebel trenches around the city. On , when the Ottomans rushed on the Čegar hill defended by Stevan Sinđelić, and vojvoda Miloje did not let anybody aid them, Paulj decided against the command and went for Čegar. Paulj did not reach in time; when the Ottomans had surrounded and overtook Sinđelić's trench, he decided to blow up the gunpowder magazine and kill everyone on the hill. Paulj and his small unit were defeated and forced to retreat, as others, to Deligrad. He mostly stayed in Deligrad after this. The Serbian Ruling Council appointed Paulj the first permanent commander of Gurgusovac (Knjaževac) after the Treaty of Bucharest (1812).

In the 1812–13 Protocol of Karađorđe, there are ten numbers written for Paulj. In 1813, he fled to the Habsburg monarchy, while the Austrians sent him to stay in Leoben for a time. He returned to Serbia in 1815, and died in his home village.

He begged for the hand of the daughter of Momir of Lučica for his son Budimir, and they married.

Legacy
There is a Serbian cultural association named after him. A statue of his was erected in his home village Melnica in 2004. A water mill in his ownership is today a recognized cultural monument.

See also
 List of Serbian Revolutionaries

References

Sources
 
 
 
 
 
 
 

1770 births
1816 deaths
19th-century Serbian people
Serbian revolutionaries
People of the First Serbian Uprising
People from Petrovac, Serbia
Serbian military leaders